was a Japanese castle located in Akitakata, Hiroshima Prefecture.

History 
Yoshida-Kōriyama Castle was initially built as a small castle in Aki Province in the 14th century, but was later expanded into a large castle by Mōri Motonari, a famous daimyō of the powerful Mōri clan, in the 16th century during the Sengoku period. The Mōri originally came to the Yoshida area from Sagami Province (now Kanagawa Prefecture) in 1336. Having survived the war during the Nanboku-chō period (14th century), they continued to expand their territories in the Chūgoku region.

For much of the early Sengoku period, the castle was small, and the Mōri found themselves vulnerable, wedged between the Ouchi clan of Suo Province and the Amago clan of Izumo Province. In September 1540, the Amago besieged the castle at the Siege of Koriyama, but the Mōri defeated them with Ouchi assistance in January 1541. Mōri Motonari first defeated the Amago with the help of the Ouchi, and then defeated the Ouchi after they were weakened by internal conflict. The Mōri became more influential, and extended its holdings to cover most of the Chugoku region. Yoshida-Kōriyama Castle was repaired, rebuilt and expanded in size to cover most of the mountain. It became quite advanced for a mountaintop castle (yamashiro), with complex inner and outer stone walls, a quadrangle and a stone-walled fort.

In 1589, Mori Terumoto began the construction of Hiroshima Castle as the new seat of his domains and relocated there in 1591, but Yoshida-Kōriyama was retained as the castle was important for Mōri clan. However, in 1600, the Mōri joined the western alliance against Tokugawa Ieyasu and participated in the Battle of Sekigahara. When the western allies lost the battle, the Mōri clan were stripped of their eastern territories (including Aki Province) and forced west into the provinces of Suō and Nagato. Yoshida-Kōriyama Castle was largely demolished in the early Edo period under the "one domain-one castle" policy of the Tokugawa shogunate, like many castles in Japan that were not the seat of a domain.

Preservation 
There are some substantial structures left at the current site, mainly some low stone walls and moats. However, considering it was such a large castle that covered much of the mountain, there are about 130 relics left of the castle on the site.

Akitakata City Historical Museum is located near the castle, where excavated artefacts from the castle are exhibited.

Gallery

See also
List of Historic Sites of Japan (Hiroshima)

References 

Castles in Hiroshima Prefecture
Historic Sites of Japan
Former castles in Japan
Ruined castles in Japan
Mōri clan
16th-century establishments in Japan